Landau reflex or Landau reaction refers to a reflex seen in infants when held horizontally in the air in the prone position. It emerges 3 months after birth and lasts until up to 12 months to 24 months of age. A normal response of infants when held in a horizontal prone position is to maintain a convex arc with the head raised and the legs slightly flexed. It is poor in those with floppy infant syndrome and exaggerated in hypertonic and opisthotonic infants.

Interpretation 
An abnormal Landau reflex may indicate hypotonia or hypertonia and may indicate a motor development issue.

References 

Reflexes
Pediatrics